Ibironke Ojo-Anthony (born 17 July 1974) professionally known as Ronke Oshodi Oke  is a Nigerian film actress, musician, director and producer.

Early life and career
Ibironke Ojo Anthony professionally known as Ronke Oshodi oke is descent of Ondo State.she was born July 17,1974 in Oworonshoki, Lagos State Southwestern Nigeria, where she completed her primary and secondary education. 
She began her acting career with a drama group called Star Parade under the leadership of Fadeyi, a Nigerian actor but became a household name in the year 2000 when she featured in a movie titled Oshodi Oke, from which she got her stage name.
Her musical career began in 2014, the same year she launched her debut album which is yet to be released. In 2015, she released a single titled Ori Mi which featured 9ice.

Personal life 
Ronke is married and has a son.

Filmography
Succubus (2014)
Isan Laye
Eesu
Agbere Oju
Return of Jenifa
Abeke Aleko
Abeke Eleko 2
Ajiloda
Aimasiko eda (2006)
Okun Ife 2 (2004)
Okun Ife (2004)
Asiri (2002)
Oshodi Oke (2000)
The Eve (2018 film)
The Ghost and the Tout (2020)
Oko were
Brotherhood (2022 film)

Awards and nominations

See also
 List of Nigerian film producers
 List of Nigerian Yoruba actor

References

External links 
 

1974 births
Living people
Yoruba actresses
Actresses in Yoruba cinema
20th-century Nigerian actresses
21st-century Nigerian actresses
Actresses from Lagos
Nigerian film award winners
People from Ondo State
Nigerian film directors
Nigerian women musicians
Nigerian film actresses
Nigerian film producers